Howell is a town located in the Blue Creek Valley in northeast Box Elder County, Utah, United States. The population was 245 at the 2010 census.

Geography

Demographics

As of the census of 2000, there were 221 people, 68 households, and 55 families residing in the town. The population density was 6.2 people per square mile (2.4/km2). There were 75 housing units at an average density of 2.1 per square mile (0.8/km2). The racial makeup of the town was 99.10% White, 0.45% African American and 0.45% Native American.

There were 68 households, out of which 41.2% had children under the age of 18 living with them, 75.0% were married couples living together, 4.4% had a female householder with no husband present, and 19.1% were non-families. 19.1% of all households were made up of individuals, and 4.4% had someone living alone who was 65 years of age or older. The average household size was 3.25 and the average family size was 3.76.

In the town, the population was spread out, with 36.2% under the age of 18, 12.2% from 18 to 24, 20.8% from 25 to 44, 22.6% from 45 to 64, and 8.1% who were 65 years of age or older. The median age was 26 years. For every 100 females, there were 130.2 males. For every 100 females age 18 and over, there were 101.4 males.

The median income for a household in the town was $40,750, and the median income for a family was $42,250. Males had a median income of $39,861 versus $12,292 for females. The per capita income for the town was $16,510. About 7.3% of families and 7.6% of the population were below the poverty line, including 12.6% of those under the age of eighteen and 17.6% of those 65 or over.

History
Howell lies in the Blue Creek Valley that stretches north-south between four mountain ranges, Promontory Mountains, south, North Promontory Mountains, west, West Hills, northeast, and Blue Spring Hills, southeast. The northeast Great Salt Lake lies to the south of Howell, and north of Howell finds Interstate 84, roughly the area known to locals as Blue Creek. Nomadic Shoshone Indians used the area to travel between the Great Salt Lake and areas to the north.

The Golden Spike was driven near Promontory (at Lampo) in 1869. Crocker formed the Promontory Land and Livestock Company in this time period, which had land holdings that stretched from the Great Salt Lake north to Idaho, and west to Nevada. The area was used for cattle ranching, with headquarters in Promontory, Howell, and the Dilly Ranch. The company disbanded in 1909.

In 1909 the newly created Promontory-Curlew Land Company purchased the Promontory Land and Livestock Company's Utah and Idaho land holdings. Howell is named after Utah Congressman Joseph Howell who was involved with the Promontory-Curlew Land Company.

In 1910 Nephi Nessen purchased  from the Promontory-Curlew Land Company, and established the first private and permanent residence in Howell. Nessen was born in Logan, Utah in 1867, the son of Danish immigrants and converts to the Church of Jesus Christ of Latter-day Saints who crossed the plains from the east as part of a Handcart company. Other settler families included Andersen, Baxter, Cravens, Gunnell, Bailey, Carlsen, Douglas, Fonnesbeck, Rock, Wood, Allen, Barber, and Maughn.

The Bar M Ranch was headquartered near what is now the town center. A school was opened in 1910 in a Bar M Ranch building. In 1911, a new school was opened (pictured above), which has now been converted into a community center. In 1980, a modern school was built for kindergarten through third grades, but closed in 2008.

However, the reservoir is now located almost entirely within the town limits

Transportation
While I-84 only passes through the northeastern corner of the town, SR-83 heads south from the interstate to pass through the town (and continues on to Corinne).

See also

 List of cities and towns in Utah

References

External links

 Howell - archived page on Box Elder County website (via web.archive.org)
 Howell history (on Box Elder County website)

Towns in Box Elder County, Utah
Towns in Utah
Populated places established in 1909
1909 establishments in Utah